Askrova Chapel is a chapel (and community centre) of the Church of Norway in Kinn Municipality in Vestland county, Norway. It is located in the small village of Espeset on the west side of the island of Askrova. It is an annex chapel in the Bru parish which is part of the Sunnfjord prosti (deanery) in the Diocese of Bjørgvin. The white, wooden chapel was built in 1957 in a long church design. The chapel seats about 120 people. The parish holds about six worship services per year at the chapel, in addition to special services such as baptisms, weddings, and funerals.

History
Fundraising for a prayer house on the island of Askrova began in the 1920s, and some money was raised, but it was slow. In 1953, after World War II, this effort gained traction and began to yield results. A prayer house chapel was built in 1957 with Kristoffer Stensbakk as the builder. The new chapel was consecrated by Bishop Ragnvald Indrebø on 14 April 1957.  In 1962, an extension on the north side of the nave was built which housed a larger entry area and coat room. In 1964, a small tower on the roof was built. In 1988, the building was renovated and enlarged again. This time the interior was redone. The ceiling of the nave was vaulted (originally it had a flat ceiling).

See also
List of churches in Bjørgvin

References

Kinn
Churches in Vestland
Long churches in Norway
Wooden churches in Norway
20th-century Church of Norway church buildings
Churches completed in 1957
1957 establishments in Norway